Grizzly Island is a small island in Grizzly Bay (part of Suisun Bay) in the San Francisco Bay Area of California. It is part of Solano County, partially managed by Reclamation Districts 2112 (Schafer Pintail), 2129 (Frost Lake) and 2136 (Grizzly West). Islands that partially cover some of its current area, labelled "Warrington Island" and "Davis Island", are shown on an 1850 survey map of the San Francisco Bay area made by Cadwalader Ringgold and an 1854 map of the area by Henry Lange. It is labeled, along with Deadman Island, Joice Island, Simmons Island, Ryer Island and Roe Island, on a 1902 USGS map of the area.

References

Islands of the San Francisco Bay Area
Islands of Northern California
Islands of Solano County, California
Islands of Suisun Bay